The Kreutzer Sonata is a 1922 German silent film directed by Rolf Petersen and starring Frederic Zelnik, Alfons Fryland, and Erich Kaiser-Titz. It is based on the 1889 novella of the same name by Leo Tolstoy.

Cast

References

Bibliography

External links

1922 films
Films of the Weimar Republic
German silent feature films
Films based on The Kreutzer Sonata
German black-and-white films